The Mad Empress is a 1939 American historical drama film depicting the 3-year reign of Maximilian I of Mexico (Nagel) and his struggles against Benito Juarez (Robards). Empress Carlotta (Novora) is the "mad" empress who has a breakdown when she realizes her husband is condemned to death.

Cast
Conrad Nagel – Emperor Maximilian I of Mexico
Medea de Novara – Empress Carlotta of Mexico
Duncan Renaldo – Colonel Miguel López 
Lionel Atwill – General Achille Bazaine
Guy Bates Post – French Emperor Napoleon III
Jason Robards Sr. – Benito Juarez
Frank McGlynn Sr. – Abraham Lincoln
Earl Gunn – Porfirio Díaz

References

External links
 
 
 
 

1939 films
American black-and-white films
Second French intervention in Mexico films
Depictions of Abraham Lincoln on film
Cultural depictions of Napoleon III
Cultural depictions of Porfirio Díaz
American historical comedy-drama films
1930s historical comedy-drama films
American films based on actual events
Films set in Mexico
Cultural depictions of Mexican women
Films directed by Miguel Contreras Torres
1930s English-language films
1930s American films